"I've Come to Expect It from You" is a song written by Buddy Cannon and Dean Dillon, and recorded by American country music artist George Strait. It was released in October 1990 as the third and final single from his album Livin' It Up. It peaked at number 1 on both the U.S. Billboard Hot Country Singles & Tracks chart and the Canadian RPM Country Tracks chart. In the United States it stayed at number 1 for five weeks. In Canada, it reached number 1 in January 1991 and stayed there for one week.

Content
The song is about the male narrator describing his ex-lover's apathetic attitude. It is composed in the key of B-flat major with a main chord pattern of F7-B.

Critical reception
Rating it "A", Kevin John Coyne of Country Universe wrote that "It’s nervy and angry, with a thread of bitterness that Strait has rarely explored in his work."

Chart performance

Year-end charts

References

1990 singles
George Strait songs
Songs written by Dean Dillon
Songs written by Buddy Cannon
Song recordings produced by Jimmy Bowen
MCA Records singles
1990 songs